The Parching Winds of Somalia (1984) is a documentary film produced by Charles Geshekter.

Subject matter
The film provides a close look at how the nomadic inhabitants of Somalia have withstood the ravages of a harsh desert environment and the encroachment of European imperial forces by synthesizing knowledge of the past, Muslim practices, and skillful livestock management in a successful fusion of traditional values with modern techniques.

Form
The Parching Winds of Somalia features extensive location footage in Somalia, historical photographs, interviews, and contemporary Somali music.

Other
The film is rated ages 14 and up in the United States. It was released on video in 1993 by PBS Video VHS.

References

Sources

1984 documentary films
1984 films
English-language Somalian films
Somalian documentary films
1980s English-language films